Mam Rashan is a former Yazidi village located in Shekhan district of the Duhok Governorate in Kurdistan Region, Iraq, which was destroyed in 1976 by the Iraqi government as part of Arabization policies. The inhabitants were as a result resettled in the collective town of Mahad.

References 

Yazidi populated places in Iraq
Dohuk Governorate
Nineveh Plains